The 2016 Unibet World Grand Prix was the 19th staging of the World Grand Prix. It was played from 2–8 October 2016 at the Citywest Hotel in Dublin, Ireland.

Robert Thornton was the defending champion after beating Michael van Gerwen 5–4 in sets in the last year's final, but he lost in the first round to Stephen Bunting.

Michael van Gerwen won his third Grand Prix title after defeating Gary Anderson 5–2 in the final.

Prize money
The total prize money remained at £400,000. The following is the breakdown of the fund:

Qualification
The field of 32 players was made up from the top 16 on the PDC Order of Merit on September 25. The remaining 16 places went to the top 14 non-qualified players from the ProTour Order of Merit and then to the top two non-qualified residents of the Republic of Ireland and Northern Ireland from the 2016 ProTour Order of Merit. The top eight players are seeded in the tournament.

The following players are taking part in the tournament:

Draw
The draw was made on 25 September during the 2016 Champions League of Darts.

References

World Grand Prix (darts)
World Grand Prix
World Grand Prix (darts)
World Grand Prix (darts)
World Grand Prix (darts), 2016